This article lists political parties in Puerto Rico.

Puerto Rico has a 'first past the post' electoral system, in which a voter can vote by party, by candidate or both. To qualify as an official political party (and thus be able to appear on the printed state electoral ballot), a party must meet the criteria set forth by the Puerto Rico Electoral Law.

This list sorts political parties either alphabetically or by date of founding.

Registered parties

Present 
As of 2020, Puerto Rico has five registered electoral parties:

Past – under U.S. sovereignty 
The existing parties in Puerto Rico at the time of change of sovereignty in 1898 reinvented themselves into parties with by-laws, platforms and ideologies consistent with the new political reality brought about by the change of sovereignty.  The Barbosistas, followers of Jose Celso Barbosa and mostly aligned with Partido Autonomista Ortodoxo, formed the Partido Republicano Puertorriqueño, while the Muñocistas, followers of Luis Muñoz Rivera and mostly aligned with Partido Liberal Puertorriqueño, formed Partido Federal.

Past – under Spain sovereignty 
There were no political parties in Puerto Rico until 1870. Bolivar Pagan states the following were the political parties in Puerto Rico during the years of Spanish sovereignty.

Unregistered parties 
A number of unregistered political parties and organizations exist in Puerto Rico outside of the electoral arena. These organizations span the entire political spectrum:

 Hostosian National Independence Movement (MINH) – (Umbrella organization in favor of pro independence and nationalist movements) – Movimiento Independentista Nacional Hostosiano
 Pro ELA – In favor of a freely associated republic status.
 Puerto Rican Nationalist Party
 Socialist Front – An umbrella of socialist organizations.
 Socialist Workers Movement – Socialist Revolutionary organization, with strong bases in the trade union and student movement. Bandera Roja – Periodical, in Spanish
 United Statehooders – Estadistas Unidos.

Affiliates of federal-level United States parties
Unlike the political parties listed above, which are eligible for registration with the Comisión Estatal de Elecciones (CEE) upon fulfilling CEE requirements, the following parties exist as affiliates of American parties and participate in the U.S. primaries of the corresponding American parties at the federal level. Also, unlike the Puerto Rican political parties above, all of which are based in Puerto Rico, these parties are headquartered in mainland United States.  

 Democratic Party of Puerto Rico – (Spanish: Partido Demócrata de Puerto Rico) is the Puerto Rico affiliate of the U.S. national Democratic Party.
 Libertarian Party of Puerto Rico – (Spanish: Partido Libertario) is a Puerto Rico affiliate of the U.S. national Libertarian Party
 Republican Party of Puerto Rico – (Spanish: Partido Republicano de Puerto Rico) is the Puerto Rico affiliate of the U.S. national Republican Party

See also 

 Historia de los Partidos Políticos Puertorriqueños (1898-1956)
 Politics of Puerto Rico
 Political party strength in Puerto Rico
 Elections in Puerto Rico
 Puerto Rican Independence Movement

Notes

References

External links

Party sites
New Progressive Party (PNP)
Puerto Ricans for Puerto Rico (PRPR)
Commonwealth Elections Commission of Puerto Rico (see: General Information)
Popular Democratic Party of Puerto Rico (PPD)
Socialist Workers Movement (MST)
Republican Party of Puerto Rico

Miscellaneous links
CIA World Factbook: Puerto Rico
Elections in Puerto Rico
Puerto Rican Politics Portal

Political parties
Puerto Rico

Political parties in Puerto Rico
Puerto Rico